Abdul Rehman Makki is a Pakistani radical Islamist and the second-in-command of Jamaat-ud-Dawah (JuD) a Pakistani Islamic-welfarist-militant political organization and Naib Ameer of Lashkar-e-Taiba (LeT), the Pakistani Islamist militant organisation which is operating against India. He is the cousin and brother-in-law of Hafiz Muhammad Saeed. He has previously taught at the Islamic University of Madinah, Saudi Arabia, and, in 2004, released a book showing how fedayeen operations are not suicide attacks.

Biography
Abdul Rehman Makki, alongside Hafiz Saeed, is currently working for Difa-e-Pakistan Council (DPC) which is designated to defend the interests of Pakistan and to agitate against the drone attacks in Waziristan, Pakistan. DPC, in its own words, is against the war in Afghanistan. It has also protested against the NATO supplies going through Pakistan.

Makki is alleged to be in proximity to Taliban's supreme commander Mullah Omar and al-Qaeda's Ayman al-Zawahiri. He is popular in Pakistan for his anti-India speeches. In 2017, his son, Owaid Rehman Makki was killed in operation by Indian security forces in Jammu and Kashmir

The United States Department of the Treasury has designated Makki as a Specially Designated International Terrorist. It lists his address in Muridke, the headquarters of Lashkar-e-Taiba. Rewards for Justice Terror List has a announced reward of upto $2 million for information leading to the location of Makki.

Pakistan's foreign minister, Hina Rabbani Khar has said that they would need hard evidence to prosecute Hafiz Saeed and his allies such as Abdul Rehman Makki.

In 2020, an Anti Terrorism Court of Pakistan convicted Makki for terror financing and sentenced him to jail but this was commuted to a  fine by another court.

On 16 January 2023, he was designated by the Al-Qaida and Taliban Sanctions Committee of the United Nations Security Council. India and the US had wanted Makki to be sanctioned as a global terrorist back in 2022, but the designation had then been blocked by China.

References

External links

Living people
Pakistani Islamists
Lashkar-e-Taiba members
People from Bahawalpur
Punjabi people
Academic staff of the Islamic University of Madinah
Specially Designated Nationals and Blocked Persons List
Individuals designated as terrorists by the United States government
Leaders of Islamic terror groups
People convicted on terrorism charges
Ahl-i Hadith people
Year of birth missing (living people)
Hafiz Muhammad Saeed
People designated by the Al-Qaida and Taliban Sanctions Committee